Korporal is the German and Danish spelling of the English corporal. Korporal is used in a number of armed forces as the lowest rank of the non-commissioned officers group. However, in the German Bundeswehr, it is considered a high enlisted personnel rank. In Switzerland the rank is used in the Fire Department as well.

In former German armed forces, the designation of the lowest NCO rank was "Corporal".

Austria

Korporal (Kpl) is a rank of the enlisted men rank group (EN group) in the Austrian Bundesheer, and is equivalent to NATO-Rang code OR-3. In the k.u.k Army it still counted to the NCO rank group and was allowed to wear the yellow-black port epée.

Today and in the comparison to the German Bundeswehr it is equivalent to the EN-rank “Hauptgefreiter/ Stabsgefreiter ”. In peacetime the Korporal might be tasked to command a small sub unit, e.g. a fileteam (de: Trupp, 2 to 8 men) or a squad (de: Gruppe, 8-13 men).

During United Nations missions and in NATO Partnership for Peace the rank Korporal will be designated in English with Corporal (Cpl) and is equivalent to NATO-Rang code OR-3.

k.u.k. Army 

Korporal was also a rank of the k.u.k. Austro-Hungarian Army. Rank insignia were two white celluloid-star on the stand-up collar of the Waffenrock on gorget patch. Stand-up collar and background of the gorget patch showed a particular egalisation colour. This rank was corresponding to the ranks of enlisted men as follows:

Bataillonshornist (Battalion bugler)
Bataillonstambour (Battalion drummer) 
Geschütz-Vormeister (Gunner-corporal) artillery
Gewehr-Vormeister (Machinegun-corporal ) infantry
Unterjäger (Rifles-corporal) mountain troops
Waffenmeister 3. Klasse (Weapon master 3rd class) artillery and weapon arsenal

Korporal in adjutation of the k.u.k. infantry

Denmark

It was originally the lowest NCO, but in 2008 it became the highest enlisted rank.

By 1972, the rank was only temporarily given. On 1 October 2008, 23  from the Army were the first to be permanently appointed , since 1972, while simultaneously being made an enlisted rank.

On 9 March 2012, 12 naval and 12 aviation specialists, were appointed . In the Navy, the degree is intended for employees who act as assistant instructors.

Germany

  is the second highest enlisted rank in the German Bundeswehr, that might be comparable to corporal (OR-4) in Anglophone armed forces. However, as distinguished from the corporal in Anglophone armed forces, the  belongs to the rank group of enlisted men.

History 
Pay grade of Korporal is A6, that is the same pay grade as the NCO rank Stabsunteroffizier (OR-5).

Soldiers have to have served for at least three years in the rank of  before being considered for promotion.

Norway

In Norway, the rank is only used by the Norwegian Army. Here  is split into 4 classes and is the "specialist officer" rank group.

Switzerland 

In the Military of Switzerland the Korporal is the lowest NCO-rank. The rank is higher than the enlisted rank Obergefreiter.

Until the so-called Army reform XXI (with effect from January 1, 2004) the regular Korporal appointment was to squad leader (de: Gruppenführer, 8-13 men). However, in 2014 this appointment was upgraded to Wachtmeister (OR-5). The Korporal rank was converted to military specialist without any command function.

Korporal is also a rank designation in the "Switzerland armed forces postal system", and in CBRN Defence.

In United Nations missions and in NATO Partnership for Peace the rank Korporal will be designated in English with Corporal (Cpl).

Other armed forces

The Netherlands 
In the Netherlands the promotion to "Korporaal" is possible after a longer service time in the enlisted men rank group. There are two corporal ranks:
Korporaal OR-3
Korporaal der 1e klasse OR-4

Vatican City 
In the Pontifical Swiss Guard there are two corporal ranks:
Korporal and
Vizekorporal

Poland 
In the Polish armed forces there are the two Korporal OR4-rank :
 Kapral [short: kpr.] (en: Corporal)
 Starszy kapral [short: st. kpr.]) (en: Senior corporal)

Prussia 
In Prussia the "Corporal" commanded an up to 30 men strong so-called Korporalschaft. The rank sequence was as follows:
Gefreiter
Korporal
Sergant and/or Feldwebel
In 1856 the designation korporal was changed to Unteroffizier. Until 1807 the (aristocrat) officer aspirants were called Freikorporal.

Examples

References 

 Die Streitkräfte der Republik Österreich, 1918-1968, Heeresgeschichtliches Museum, Militärwissenschaftliches Institut, 1968.

Military ranks of Germany
Military ranks of Austria
Military ranks of Switzerland
Austro-Hungarian Army
Military ranks of Norway